Acrocercops is a genus of moths in the family Gracillariidae.

Species

Acrocercops acanthidias Meyrick, 1934
Acrocercops achnodes Meyrick, 1915
Acrocercops aeglophanes (Turner, 1913)
Acrocercops aellomacha (Meyrick, 1880)
Acrocercops aeolellum (Meyrick, 1880)
Acrocercops aethalota (Meyrick, 1880)
Acrocercops affinis Braun, 1918
Acrocercops albida Turner, 1947
Acrocercops albidorsella Bradley, 1957
Acrocercops albinatella (Chambers, 1872)
Acrocercops albofasciella Yazaki, 1926
Acrocercops albomaculella (Turner, 1894)
Acrocercops albomarginatum (Walsingham, 1897)
Acrocercops allactopa Meyrick, 1916
Acrocercops alysidota (Meyrick, 1880)
Acrocercops amethystopa Meyrick, 1916
Acrocercops amurensis Kuznetzov, 1960
Acrocercops angelica Meyrick, 1919
Acrocercops anthogramma Meyrick, 1921
Acrocercops anthracuris Meyrick, 1926
Acrocercops antigrapha Turner, 1926
Acrocercops antimima Turner, 1940
Acrocercops apicella Bradley, 1957
Acrocercops apicepunctella (Walsingham, 1891)
Acrocercops apoblepta Turner, 1913
Acrocercops arbutella Braun, 1925
Acrocercops archepolis (Meyrick, 1907)
Acrocercops argentigera Diakonoff, 1955
Acrocercops argocosma Meyrick, 1915
Acrocercops argodesma Meyrick, 1936
Acrocercops argyraspis Meyrick, 1908
Acrocercops argyrodesma (Meyrick, 1883)
Acrocercops argyrosema Turner, 1947
Acrocercops asaphogramma Meyrick, 1920
Acrocercops astericola (Frey & Boll, 1873)
Acrocercops astiopa Meyrick, 1930
Acrocercops attenuatum (Walsingham, 1897)
Acrocercops auricilla (Stainton, 1859)
Acrocercops autadelpha (Meyrick, 1880)
Acrocercops autarithma Meyrick, 1934
Acrocercops axinophora Turner, 1940
Acrocercops barringtoniella (van Deventer, 1904)
Acrocercops bifasciata (Walsingham, 1891)
Acrocercops bifrenis Meyrick, 1918
Acrocercops bisinuata Meyrick, 1921
Acrocercops brachyglypta Meyrick, 1931
Acrocercops breyeri Bourquin, 1962
Acrocercops brochogramma Meyrick, 1914
Acrocercops brongniardella (Fabricius, 1798)
Acrocercops caementosa Meyrick, 1915
Acrocercops caenotheta (Meyrick, 1880)
Acrocercops calicella (Stainton, 1862)
Acrocercops calycophthalma Meyrick, 1926
Acrocercops camptochrysa Meyrick, 1921
Acrocercops candida Turner, 1947
Acrocercops castellata Meyrick, 1908
Acrocercops chalcea Turner, 1926
Acrocercops chalceopla (Turner, 1913)
Acrocercops chalinopa Meyrick, 1920
Acrocercops chalinosema Meyrick, 1936
Acrocercops charitopis Meyrick, 1915
Acrocercops chenopa Meyrick, 1932
Acrocercops cherimoliae Ghesquière, 1940
Acrocercops chionoplecta (Meyrick, 1883)
Acrocercops chionosema Turner, 1940
Acrocercops chloronympha Meyrick, 1921
Acrocercops chrysargyra Meyrick, 1908
Acrocercops chrysometra (Meyrick, 1926)
Acrocercops chrysophila Meyrick, 1937
Acrocercops chrysophylli Vári, 1961
Acrocercops chrysoplitis Meyrick, 1937
Acrocercops cirrhantha Meyrick, 1915
Acrocercops cissiella Busck, 1934
Acrocercops citrodora Meyrick, 1914
Acrocercops clepsinoma Meyrick, 1916
Acrocercops clinogramma Meyrick, 1930
Acrocercops clinozona Meyrick, 1920
Acrocercops clisiopa Meyrick, 1935
Acrocercops clisiophora Turner, 1940
Acrocercops clitoriella Busck, [1934]
Acrocercops clytosema Meyrick, 1920
Acrocercops cocciferellum (Chrétien, 1910)
Acrocercops coffeifoliella (Motschulsky, 1859)
Acrocercops coloptila Meyrick, 1937
Acrocercops combreticola Vári, 1961
Acrocercops contorta Meyrick, 1920
Acrocercops convoluta Meyrick, 1908
Acrocercops cordiella Busck, 1934
Acrocercops cornicina Meyrick, 1908
Acrocercops crotalistis Meyrick, 1915
Acrocercops crucigera Meyrick, 1920
Acrocercops crypsigrapha Meyrick, 1930
Acrocercops crystallopa Meyrick, 1916
Acrocercops cyanodeta Meyrick, 1918
Acrocercops cyclogramma Meyrick, 1921
Acrocercops cylicota Meyrick, 1914
Acrocercops cyma Bradley, 1957
Acrocercops cymella Forbes, 1931
Acrocercops cyphostacta Meyrick, 1921
Acrocercops defigurata Meyrick, 1928
Acrocercops delicata Meyrick, 1921
Acrocercops demotes Walsingham, 1914
Acrocercops desmochares Meyrick, 1921
Acrocercops diacentrota Meyrick, 1935
Acrocercops diatonica Meyrick, 1916
Acrocercops didymella (Meyrick, 1880)
Acrocercops diffluella (van Deventer, 1904)
Acrocercops dinosticha Meyrick, 1936
Acrocercops diplacopa Meyrick, 1936
Acrocercops distylii Kumata & Kuroko, 1988
Acrocercops doloploca Meyrick, 1921
Acrocercops encentris Meyrick, 1915
Acrocercops enchlamyda (Turner, 1894)
Acrocercops ennychodes Meyrick, 1921
Acrocercops epiclina Meyrick, 1918
Acrocercops eranista Meyrick, 1918
Acrocercops erebopa Meyrick, 1936
Acrocercops erioplaca Meyrick, 1918
Acrocercops euargyra Meyrick, 1934
Acrocercops eugeniella (van Deventer, 1904)
Acrocercops eupetala (Meyrick, 1880)
Acrocercops eurhythmopa Meyrick, 1934
Acrocercops euryschema Turner, 1947
Acrocercops euthycolona Meyrick, 1931
Acrocercops extenuata Meyrick, 1916
Acrocercops fasciculata Meyrick, 1915
Acrocercops ficina Vári, 1961
Acrocercops fuscapica Bland, 1980
Acrocercops galeopa Meyrick, 1908
Acrocercops gemmans Walsingham, 1914
Acrocercops geologica Meyrick, 1908
Acrocercops glutella (van Deventer, 1904)
Acrocercops goniodesma Meyrick, 1934
Acrocercops gossypii Vári, 1961
Acrocercops grammatacma Meyrick, 1921
Acrocercops guttiferella (Viette, 1951)
Acrocercops habroscia Meyrick, 1921
Acrocercops hapalarga Meyrick, 1916
Acrocercops haplocosma Meyrick, 1936
Acrocercops hapsidota Meyrick, 1915
Acrocercops hastigera Meyrick, 1915
Acrocercops hedymopa Turner, 1913
Acrocercops helicomitra Meyrick, 1924
Acrocercops helicopa Meyrick, 1919
Acrocercops hemiglypta Meyrick, 1916
Acrocercops heptadrachma Diakonoff, 1955
Acrocercops heterodoxa Meyrick, 1912
Acrocercops heteroloba Meyrick, 1932
Acrocercops hexachorda Meyrick, 1914
Acrocercops hexaclosta Meyrick, 1934
Acrocercops hierocosma Meyrick, 1912
Acrocercops hippuris Meyrick, 1915
Acrocercops homalacta Meyrick, 1927
Acrocercops hoplocala (Meyrick, 1880)
Acrocercops hormista Meyrick, 1916
Acrocercops hyphantica Meyrick, 1912
Acrocercops imperfecta Gozmány, 1960
Acrocercops inconspicua Forbes, 1930
Acrocercops insulariella Opler, 1971
Acrocercops insulella (Walsingham, 1891)
Acrocercops ipomoeae Busck, [1934]
Acrocercops iraniana Triberti, 1990
Acrocercops irradians Meyrick, 1931
Acrocercops irrorata (Turner, 1894)
Acrocercops isodelta Meyrick, 1908
Acrocercops isotoma Turner, 1940
Acrocercops karachiella Amsel, 1968
Acrocercops laciniella (Meyrick, 1880)
Acrocercops largoplaga Legrand, 1965
Acrocercops lenticulata Meyrick, 1922
Acrocercops leptalea (Turner, 1900)
Acrocercops leucocyma (Meyrick, 1889)
Acrocercops leucographa Clarke, 1953
Acrocercops leucomochla Turner, 1926
Acrocercops leuconota (Zeller, 1877)
Acrocercops leucophaea Meyrick, 1919
Acrocercops leucostega (Meyrick, 1932)
Acrocercops leucotoma Turner, 1913
Acrocercops lithochalca Meyrick, 1930
Acrocercops lithogramma Meyrick, 1920
Acrocercops lophonota Meyrick, 1921
Acrocercops loxias Meyrick, 1918
Acrocercops luctuosa Meyrick, 1915
Acrocercops lyrica Meyrick, 1908
Acrocercops lysibathra Meyrick, 1916
Acrocercops macaria Turner, 1913
Acrocercops macrochalca Meyrick, 1910
Acrocercops macroclina Meyrick, 1916
Acrocercops macroplaca Meyrick, 1908
Acrocercops malvacea Walsingham, 1907
Acrocercops mantica Meyrick, 1908
Acrocercops maranthaceae Busck, 1934
Acrocercops marmarauges Meyrick, 1936
Acrocercops marmaritis Walsingham, 1914
Acrocercops martaella Legrand, 1965
Acrocercops mechanopla Meyrick, 1934
Acrocercops melanocosma Meyrick, 1920
Acrocercops melanoplecta Meyrick, 1908
Acrocercops melantherella Busck, 1934
Acrocercops mendosa Meyrick, 1912
Acrocercops mesochaeta Meyrick, 1920
Acrocercops microphis Meyrick, 1921
Acrocercops myriogramma Meyrick, 1937
Acrocercops nebropa Meyrick, 1927
Acrocercops nereis (Meyrick, 1880)
Acrocercops niphocremna Meyrick, 1932
Acrocercops nitidula (Stainton, 1862)
Acrocercops nolckeniella (Zeller, 1877)
Acrocercops obscurella (Turner, 1894)
Acrocercops obversa Meyrick, 1915
Acrocercops ochnifolii Vári, 1961
Acrocercops ochrocephala (Meyrick, 1880)
Acrocercops ochronephela Meyrick, 1908
Acrocercops ochroptila Turner, 1913
Acrocercops ophiodes (Turner, 1896)
Acrocercops orbifera Meyrick, 1908
Acrocercops orianassa Meyrick, 1932
Acrocercops ornata (Walsingham, 1897)
Acrocercops ortholocha Meyrick, 1908
Acrocercops orthostacta Meyrick, 1918
Acrocercops osteopa Meyrick, 1920
Acrocercops paliacma Meyrick, 1930
Acrocercops panacicorticis (Watt, 1920)
Acrocercops panacifinens (Watt, 1920)
Acrocercops panacitorsens (Watt, 1920)
Acrocercops panacivagans (Watt, 1920)
Acrocercops panacivermiforma (Watt, 1920)
Acrocercops parallela (Turner, 1894)
Acrocercops patellata Meyrick, 1921
Acrocercops patricia Meyrick, 1908
Acrocercops pectinivalva Bland, 1980
Acrocercops penographa Meyrick, 1920
Acrocercops pentacycla Meyrick, 1934
Acrocercops pentalocha Meyrick, 1912
Acrocercops pertenuis Turner, 1923
Acrocercops perturbata Meyrick, 1921
Acrocercops petalopa Meyrick, 1934
Acrocercops phaeodeta Meyrick, 1927
Acrocercops phaeomorpha Meyrick, 1919
Acrocercops phaeospora Meyrick, 1916
Acrocercops pharopeda Meyrick, 1916
Acrocercops piligera Meyrick, 1915
Acrocercops plebeia (Turner, 1894)
Acrocercops plectospila Meyrick, 1921
Acrocercops plocamis Meyrick, 1908
Acrocercops pnosmodiella (Busck, 1902)
Acrocercops poliocephala Turner, 1913
Acrocercops polyclasta Meyrick, 1919
Acrocercops pontifica Forbes, 1931
Acrocercops praeclusa Meyrick, 1914
Acrocercops praesecta Meyrick, 1922
Acrocercops prompta Meyrick, 1916
Acrocercops prospera Meyrick, 1920
Acrocercops psaliodes Meyrick, 1926
Acrocercops punctulata (Walsingham, 1891)
Acrocercops pylonias Meyrick, 1921
Acrocercops pyrigenes (Turner, 1896)
Acrocercops quadrisecta Meyrick, 1932
Acrocercops querci Kumata & Kuroko, 1988
Acrocercops quinquistrigella (Chambers, 1875)
Acrocercops ramigera Meyrick, 1920
Acrocercops retrogressa Meyrick, 1921
Acrocercops rhodospira Meyrick, 1939
Acrocercops rhombiferellum (Frey & Boll, 1876)
Acrocercops rhombocosma Meyrick, 1911
Acrocercops rhothiastis Meyrick, 1921
Acrocercops rhothogramma T. B. Fletcher, 1933
Acrocercops rhynchograpta Meyrick, 1920
Acrocercops sarcocrossa Meyrick, 1924
Acrocercops sauropis Meyrick, 1908
Acrocercops scandalota Meyrick, 1914
Acrocercops scenias Meyrick, 1914
Acrocercops scoliograpta Meyrick, 1922
Acrocercops scriptulata Meyrick, 1916
Acrocercops selmatica Meyrick, 1918
Acrocercops serriformis Meyrick, 1930
Acrocercops serrigera Meyrick, 1915
Acrocercops siphonaula Meyrick, 1931
Acrocercops soritis Meyrick, 1915
Acrocercops sphaerodelta Meyrick, 1935
Acrocercops spodophylla Turner, 1913
Acrocercops sporograpta Meyrick, 1932
Acrocercops stalagmitis Meyrick, 1915
Acrocercops stereomita Turner, 1913
Acrocercops stricta Meyrick, 1908
Acrocercops strigosa Braun, 1914
Acrocercops strophala Meyrick, 1908
Acrocercops strophiaula Meyrick, 1935
Acrocercops supplex Meyrick, 1918
Acrocercops symbolopis Meyrick, 1936
Acrocercops symmetropa Meyrick, 1939
Acrocercops symploca Turner, 1913
Acrocercops synclinias Meyrick, 1931
Acrocercops syzygiena Vári, 1961
Acrocercops tacita Triberti, 2001
Acrocercops taeniarcha Meyrick, 1932
Acrocercops telearcha Meyrick, 1908
Acrocercops telestis Meyrick, 1911
Acrocercops tenera Meyrick, 1914
Acrocercops terminaliae (Stainton, 1862)
Acrocercops terminalina Vári, 1961
Acrocercops tetrachorda Turner, 1913
Acrocercops tetracrena Meyrick, 1908
Acrocercops tetradeta Meyrick, 1926
Acrocercops theaeformisella Viette, 1955
Acrocercops thrylodes Meyrick, 1930
Acrocercops thylacaula Meyrick, 1932
Acrocercops tomia Bradley, 1956
Acrocercops transecta Meyrick, 1931
Acrocercops trapezoides (Turner, 1894)
Acrocercops triacris Meyrick, 1908
Acrocercops tricalyx Meyrick, 1921
Acrocercops tricirrha Meyrick, 1935
Acrocercops tricyma Meyrick, 1908
Acrocercops tripolis Meyrick, 1921
Acrocercops triscalma Meyrick, 1916
Acrocercops trisigillata Meyrick, 1921
Acrocercops trissoptila Meyrick, 1921
Acrocercops tristaniae (Turner, 1894)
Acrocercops undifraga Meyrick, 1931
Acrocercops unilineata (Turner, 1894)
Acrocercops unipuncta Bradley, 1957
Acrocercops unistriata Yuan, 1986
Acrocercops urbanella (Zeller, 1877)
Acrocercops ustulatella (Stainton, 1859)
Acrocercops vallata Kumata & Kuroko, 1988
Acrocercops vanula Meyrick, 1912
Acrocercops viatica Meyrick, 1916
Acrocercops walsinghami Rebel, 1907
Acrocercops xeniella (Zeller, 1877)
Acrocercops xystrota Meyrick, 1915
Acrocercops zadocaea Meyrick, 1912
Acrocercops zamenopa Meyrick, 1934
Acrocercops zebrulella Forbes, 1931
Acrocercops zopherandra Meyrick, 1931
Acrocercops zorionella (Hudson, 1918)
Acrocercops zygonoma Meyrick, 1921

References

External links
 
 
 Global Taxonomic Database of Gracillariidae (Lepidoptera)

 
Acrocercopinae
Gracillarioidea genera